Shivmangal Singh "Suman" (5 August 1915 – 27 November 2002) was an Indian poet and academician who wrote in Hindi.

Biography 

Shivmangal Singh 'Suman' was born on 5 August 1915 at Jhagarpur, Unnao district in the United Provinces of Agra and Oudh of British India. He was a leading Hindi writer and poet. He earned a M.A.  and Ph.D. in Hindi from Benaras Hindu University. The university also honoured him with a D.Litt. in 1950.

Career
Suman worked as the Vice Chancellor of Vikram University (Ujjain) during 1968-78; the Vice-President of Uttar Pradesh Hindi Sansthan, Lucknow; Press & Cultural Attache, Indian Embassy, Kathmandu (Nepal) during 1956-61; and the President, Association of Indian Universities (New Delhi) during 1977-78.

He was the Executive President, Kalidas Academy, Ujjain, until he died of heart attack on 27 November 2002.

Upon his death, the then Prime Minister of India Atal Bihari Vajpayee said that, "Dr Shiv Mangal Singh ‘Suman’ was not only a powerful signature in the field of Hindi poetry, but he was also the custodian of the collective consciousness of his time. His creations not only expressed the pain of his own feelings, but were also fearless constructive commentary on the issues of the era."

Works

Poetry collections 
 Hillol (1939)
 Jeevan Ke Gaan (1942)
 Yug Ka Mol (1945)
 Pralay Srijan (1950)
 Vishvas Badhta Hi Gaya (1948)
 Vindhya Himalaya (1960)
 Mitti Ki Baarat (1972)
 Vani Ki Vyatha (1980)
 Kate Anguthon Ki Bandanavaren (1991)
 Fagun Me Savan
 Toffan Ki Our
 Hum Panchi Unmukt Gagan ke
 Chalana hamara kam he

Essays 
 Mahadevi Ki Kavya Sadhana

Plays 
 Prakriti Purusha Kalidasa

Source:

Awards and honours 

 Padma Shri - 1974
 Padma Bhushan - 1999
 Deva Puraskar - 1958
 Soviet Land Nehru Award - 1974
 Sahitya Akademi Award - 1974 for Mitti Ki Barat
 Shikhar Samman - 1993 from the Government of Madhya Pradesh
Bharat Bharti Award - 1993
 D.Litt. By Bhagalpur University - 1973
 D.Litt. By Jabalpur University - 1983

References

External links 
Shivmangal Singh Suman at Kavita Kosh

1915 births
2002 deaths
Hindi-language poets
Hindi-language writers
People from Unnao district
Recipients of the Padma Bhushan in literature & education
Recipients of the Sahitya Akademi Award in Hindi
Banaras Hindu University alumni
Poets from Uttar Pradesh
20th-century Indian poets
Indian male poets
Recipients of the Padma Shri in literature & education